Məhəmmədli is a village and municipality in the Imishli Rayon of Azerbaijan. It has a population of 581.

References

Populated places in Imishli District